Marcel Vigneron is an American celebrity chef best known for his award-winning restaurant and catering company, Wolf, in Los Angeles. Marcel was also the runner-up of the second season of Top Chef, which aired in 2006–2007. In 2011, he had his own television program on Syfy, Marcel's Quantum Kitchen, in which he started and ran a molecular gastronomy experiential catering company.  He later competed on Top Chef: All-Stars in 2011, on The Food Network's The Next Iron Chef in 2012 and The Food Network's "Superstar Sabotage: Heat 2" on the show Cutthroat Kitchen in 2014. Marcel has gone on to judge several televised cooking competitions, such as Iron Chef, America’s Best Cooks, and Guy's Grocery Games.

Early life
Vigneron is originally from Bainbridge Island, Washington.

Vigneron attended the Culinary Institute of America (CIA) in New York and achieved his associate degree in Culinary Arts. There, Vigneron met fellow chef Spike Mendelsohn. The two played a lot of frisbee together and became best friends; they would later compete together on the 5th season of The Next Iron Chef. At the CIA Vigneron enrolled in the teaching assistant program, where he served as the sous chef to Dwayne Lipuma at the school's Ristorante Caterina de’ Medici.

Top Chef
Vigneron appeared in season two of Bravo's reality series Top Chef, which was filmed in 2006, and aired in late 2006 and early 2007. At the time of his appearance on Top Chef, he was a Master Cook at Joël Robuchon in Las Vegas, Nevada.

On the show, he became known for his molecular gastronomy techniques, especially his use of foams. He also notably clashed with many of the show's other contestants, culminating in an incident in which several of the show's contestants egged on contestant Cliff Crooks to pin down Vigneron and shave his head.  This led to Cliff being kicked off the show.

Several Top Chef viewers blogged about discrepancies in the sequence of events relating to the hair-shaving incident, including one clip that shows contestant Elia Aboumrad during the shave attempt with all of her hair intact, despite being shown shaving her head earlier in the sequence. Activity in the blogosphere eventually attracted the attention of entertainment news outlets, some of which commented that the creative editing was done in an attempt to downplay interpersonal conflicts. Vigneron characterized the event as more like a drunken assault, and confirmed that the attack on him came before the other contestants shaved their heads, contrary to how the footage was edited.

Vigneron made it to the finals, finishing as runner-up behind the winner Ilan Hall.

Post-Top Chef
In 2008, he was an Executive Sous Chef at The Bazaar in the SLS Hotel in Beverly Hills, California.

In March 2010 it was announced that Vigneron would star in Marcel's Quantum Kitchen, a reality television show that aired on the Syfy cable network. In each episode, Marcel and his new catering and event company were hired by a demanding client to produce an extraordinary celebration or event. Marcel dreamed up a theme and cuisine for the event based on the client's requests. The show was a production of Mission Control Media with Executive Producers Michael Agbabian and Dwight Smith. The show lasted six episodes.

He returned to the Top Chef series in Top Chef: All-Stars. On the episode that aired on January 19, 2011, Marcel was eliminated from the competition after the Restaurant Wars challenge.

In 2012, Vigneron was a contestant on The Next Iron Chef: Redemption, making it into the final four before being eliminated.

In October 2013, Vigneron appeared on Iron Chef America with Spike Mendelsohn vs. Iron Chefs Zakarian and Guarnaschelli in battle "Halloween Scary Combinations".

On July 22, 2014, Vigneron appeared on NBC's Food Fighters, also on the Food Network in Canada, where he competed and won against home cook Elisha Joyce.  On September 9, 2014, Vigneron reappeared on Food Fighters where he competed and lost against home cook Jim Stark.  Vigneron's third appearance on Food Fighters aired on September 3, 2015, where he competed and lost against home cook Alice Currah.

On August 10, 2014, Vigneron appeared on Guy's Grocery Games, where he lost the competition in the final round to Chef Alex Guarnaschelli.

On October 15, 2014, Vigneron appeared on Food Network's Cutthroat Kitchen: Superstar Sabotage, where he won over $7,000 for charity.

On Season 07/Episode02 of "Guy's Grocery Games: All-Stars and A-Lister Dinners" in 2015, Vigneron went on to beat Eric Greenspan, Jet Tila and Anne Burrell. He won $20,000 for his charity, L.A. Kitchen.

In 2017, Vigneron appeared in Bong Appétit on VICELAND. Season 1, episode 1.

In 2022, He participated in season 3 of Tournament of Champions (Food network).  He faced Chef Shirley Chung, where he lost.

Personal life
Vigneron currently resides in the Los Angeles area. He is the owner of the restaurant "Wolf" on Melrose Ave. His most recent restaurant, Beefsteak, opened in August 2016.  Vigneron closed both restaurants in February 2019 to pursue catering.

He wed entrepreneur Lauren Rae Levy on November 9, 2019, in Santa Susana, California. Their son Kingston Levy Vigneron was born in December 2020.

References

Top Chef contestants
Living people
Molecular gastronomy
American chefs
American male chefs
People from Bainbridge Island, Washington
Culinary Institute of America Hyde Park alumni
Year of birth missing (living people)
American gastronomes